Mahesh Shetty (born 21 May 1984) is an Indian actor who works in television serials and Bollywood films. He made his television debut with Kis Desh Mein Hai Meraa Dil (2008) as Balraj Sahni. He is known for portraying Siddhant Kapoor in Sony Entertainment Television show Bade Acche Lagte Hain (2011) which was created and produced by Ekta Kapoor.

Personal life
Shetty married to actress Aneesha Kapoor since 2011. The couple also have a daughter. He is a close friend to his Pavitra Rishta TV serial co-stars Sushant Singh Rajput and Ankita Lokhande.

Filmography

Television
 Kis Desh Mein Hai Meraa Dil (20082010) as Nihaal Balraj Maan | Star Plus
 Ghar Ek Sapnaa (20092010) as Shlok Verma | Sahara One
 Pyaar Ka Bandhan (20092010) as Deva Daas / Milind | Sony TV
 Kesariya Balam Aavo Hamare Des (20092011) as Deep | Sahara One
 Parichay (20122013) as Abhay Diwan | Colors
 Pavitra Rishta (2010) as Jaywant Rane | Zee TV
 Bade Achhe Lagte Hain (20112014) as Siddhant Jayesh Karekar / Siddhant Amarnath Kapoor | Sony TV
 Kalash (20152017) as Saket Kapoor | Life OK
 Pyaar Ko Ho Jaane Do (20152016) as RAW Agent Jai Shergill | Sony Entertainment Television
 BOSS: Baap of Special Services (2019) as Chief | ALT Balaji

Films

Awards and nominations

References

External links
 
 

Living people
Indian male soap opera actors
Indian male television actors
21st-century Indian male actors
Place of birth missing (living people)
1984 births